Muschampia stauderi, Stauder's skipper, is a butterfly of the family Hesperiidae. The species is distributed from Morocco to Asia Minor and northern Iran, including Transcaucasia.

The wingspan is 28–30 mm.  The species inhabits mostly mountain steppe areas, dominated by legume plants and grasses. The elevation range of the species distribution is from 1800 to 2200 metres above sea level. Most probably there are two generations per year, when the first generation flies during July (sometimes starting in late June) and the second generation in on wing from late September till mid-October.

Larval host plants are Ballota foetida, Marrubium vulgare, Phlomis aurea, and Phlomis floccosa.

This species was formerly a member of the genus Carcharodus, but was transferred to Muschampia as a result of genomic research published in 2020.

Subspecies
 Muschampia stauderi stauderi
 Muschampia stauderi ambigua Verity, 1925 (Nakhichevan)

References

External links
 Carcharodus at Funet.fi
 Butterfly Conservation Armenia

Carcharodus
Butterflies described in 1913